Al Borde del Deseo was a Puerto Rican TV series that was airing in WAPA-TV in Puerto Rico and in United States in WAPA America about the true story of passionate women who share their experiences of love and disaffection in a modern world, struggling to enjoy an economic and professional position similar to that of men. They are women of different social classes, values and lifestyles opposites. Women who go through life trying to find happiness in a drama-laden comedy, that we are unveiling their aspirations, privacy, hopes, and of course their shenanigans. Women, who learn late in her life, to enjoy an independent life, ready to claim, what belongs to them. It is the story of women in common, not trying to be bigger than life itself but on the contrary, reflect the daily life of women working and struggling to achieve something better than what life has led them. Stories of women, torn from life itself. Stories of homes in the conflict, of lies, of fiery passions and above all of that unfortunate habit of human beings: infidelity.

The series finished production with a total of 26 episodes. The first episode was on October 29, 2008, and the last episode was on May 2, 2009.

Characters
Sofía (Cordelia González)
Sofía is a mature woman, sexy and desired, who's going through the dramatic process of divorce. There has only been only one man in her life, her ex-husband Augusto, but her life has a big surprise in store for her. She owns an art gallery. Her ex-husband, obsessed with her, insists on retaining her at his side. Their children, Diana and Kenny, are what she loves most in her life. Now she will meet Dario, an artist, a dreamer, a great father, but a younger man to whom she will fall in love with, without even imagining. This love, with colors of teenagers, will be hampered by the prejudice and wickedness of Augusto, while at the same time facing the seduction of her own daughter, Diana, who has set her sights on conquering Dario.

Cecilia (Sully Díaz)
Cecilia is a middle-class woman, married and apparently happy, but tormented because her husband is a soldier on the War in Iraq. But her life is about to be turned inside out when a forbidden love enters her life. A different love. A love that will test the limits of the strength of her marriage and that will endanger her life and that of her daughters when her husband returns from the war and discovers that her wife's lover is his own sister.

Estela (Linnette Torres)
Estela is a retired actress and model who wants to change the life as "living doll" she has at home by returning to television, the media she belonged to before getting married. In her attempt to recover the time lost she will discover that it has not gone in vain and life is demanding its due. She is a sexy and funny woman who apparently is very seductive when the reality is quite the opposite. The extroverted Estela hides a woman repressed and completely faithful. Her world will collapse when her long-awaited television program gets canceled amidst a huge scandal. This, coupled with an empty married life with an unfaithful scoundrel of a  husband, will make Estela seek refuge in alcohol.

Nilsa (Yvonne Caro Caro)
Nilsa is a woman who is unhappy and tired of her marriage. Her highest aspiration is to have a child. She married to have children and start a family, but her husband, who also scorns her, has different priorities. Being a passionate and desperate woman, she will seek refuge in an infidelity with a younger man, who works for a living. She will find a man that will make her feel all the pleasures she longs for, and also give her what she wants the most: a son. The dilemma will present itself when Nilsa must decide who should be the child's father.

Primitiva (Tensy-Ann Vela)
Primitiva is a woman of humble origins but determined to climb up the ladder to achieve a better life. Even though she is not good looking, she's smart and crafty. In a relentless struggle, "Primi" will be willing to do anything, even killing, to get what she wants and her cherished love.

Lissette (Nashali Enchautegui)
Sister of Cecilia's husband, and aunt to their children, she has grown to love her Sister-in-Law to the point that she will take the chance to see how far she can go while her brother fights for his life and country in the Middle East. More than a forbidden love, it is treason against her own flesh and blood, something that could cost all of them very dearly.

Diana (Joemy Blanco)
Diana is the youngest in the group. Eldest daughter of Sofia, she suffers from a bipolar condition that upsets the lives of her mother Sofia, and all those around her. Without knowing, and afterward without caring, she will become rival to her own mother for the love of one man.

Cast
Main Cast (in credit order)
Cordelia González as "Sofía"
 Sully Díaz as "Cecilia"
Linnette Torres as "Estela"
Yvonne Caro Caro as "Nilsa Ruiz"
Tensy-Ann Vela as "Primitiva 'Primi' Castrillo"
Rodolfo Jiménez as "Darío García"
 Braulio Castillo, hijo as "Augusto Linares"
Joemy "Jo" Blanco as "Diana Linares"
Carlos Esteban Fonseca as "José Luis"
Jerry Segarra as "Logan"
Nashalí Enchautegui as "Lissette"
Jonathan Cardenales as "Chuck"

Young Cast
Fernando Tarrazo as "Kenny Linares" (Sofia's son)
Joshua Rosado as "Dylan" (Kenny's friend)
Lorena Franco as "Lyra García" (Dario's daughter)

Special Guest-Stars
Javier Lorenzo as "Benny"
Julio Torresoto (Augusto's Lawyer)
Luisa Justiniano as "Mercedes"
Gilda Haddock as "Dra. Luz Vidal"
Arquimides Gonzáles as "Juanma"
Ada Belén Caballero
Rafael Fuentes
Sara Pastor as "Clotilde"
Walter Rodríguez as "Julio"
Elsie Moreau as "Doña Margot"
Gladys Nuñez as "Dario's Aunt"

Guest-Stars
Francisco Capó as "Calvin"
Cristina Sesto as "Omayra"
Nestor Rodulfo as "Luis"

Supporting Cast (in alphabetical order)
Abigail Ramos
Addiliz Borrero
Alberto Zambrana
Alexander Méndez
Alexandra Malagón
Alexandra Rivera Vélez
Alexis Fonseca
Anitza Rivera
Arella V. Maysonet
Arturo De Jesús
Astrid Vizcarrondo
Camila Terega
Cándido Rosa
Carmelo Berríos
Carmen Escribano
Clarissa Rodríguez
Elizabeth Maysonet
Emma Cáceres
Ernesto Franco
Francisco Cairol
Francisco J. Lebrón
George Reyes
Grazziella González
Gustavo A. Gil
Héctor J. Bruno
Henry Mercado
Heriberto Palas
Hugo A. Sanjurjo
Ivette Santiago
Jacob Rodríguez
Javier Escalante
Jonathan Pastrana
Jorge Antares
Juan Carlos Betancourt
Juan Carlos Del Valle
Juan Pizarro
"Juke Box"
Katherine Correa
Kidany Lugo
Kyandraliz Santori
Leonardo Castro
Lorna Otero
Luis M. Díaz Rivera
Luisa Díaz
Marchela Salazar
María Arroyo (Primi's friend)
María J. Guzmán
María T. Ramos
Mariana Isabel García
Mickey Fargas
Miguel Hernández
Miriam Cotto
Myriam Aponte
Nilsa Claudio
Oficial Clara Salabarría
Oficial David Rolón as "Police Officer #1"
Oficial Edwin Flores as "Cop #2"
Oficial Edwin Román as "Police Officer #2"
Oficial Kathy Báez as "Female Cop #1"
Oficial Luis A. Batista as "Cop #1"
Oficial Neiza M. Rivera as "Female Cop #2"
Oficial Rebeca Lozada as "Female Cop #3"
Omar Acevedo
Omar Machado (Omar)
Paola Melisa Nieves
Ramón Nazario
Rey A. Soto
Rosa Cruz
Samuel Rosario
Satsha Jorge
Shekinah Pérez
Soraya M. Vega
Valentina Salazar
Wanda Nuñez
Xiomara Rodríguez (Sofia's Maid Altagracia)
Yamira Reyes
Zoraida M. Betanco
Zuleyka M. Vega

Confirmed on PrimeraHora.com and Wapa.tv

References

External links
 
 

2000s American drama television series
Television shows set in Puerto Rico
2000s Puerto Rican television series